Clifford Ngobeni (born 27 June 1987 in Soweto, Gauteng) is a South African association football midfielder for Premier Soccer League club Mpumalanga Black Aces.

Ngobeni is a talented but injury-prone midfielder who has been on trial with Ajax Amsterdam in the past.

External links

1987 births
South African soccer players
Living people
Cape Town Spurs F.C. players
Association football midfielders
Sportspeople from Soweto
Orlando Pirates F.C. players
Lamontville Golden Arrows F.C. players